Cuthbert Scott (or Scot) (died 9 October 1564) was a Catholic academic at the University of Cambridge and Bishop of Chester.

Cambridge University
Scott was made a Fellow of Christ's College, Cambridge in 1537, became M.A. in 1538 and was Master of Christ's College from 1553 to 1556.

In 1554 he became Vice Chancellor of the University of  Cambridge.

He became D.D. of Cambridge University in 1547 and of Oxford University in 1554.

Church positions
Scott was appointed prebendary of York and, in 1554, of St Paul's, London. In 1556 he succeeded George Cotes, former Master of Balliol College, Oxford, as Bishop of Chester by papal provision.

On the accession of Elizabeth I he was one of the four Catholic bishops chosen to defend Catholic doctrine at the conference at Westminster, and immediately after this he was sent as a prisoner to the Tower of London and then in the Fleet Prison 1559–1563. Being released on bail, he contrived to escape to the Continent.

He died at Leuven, on 9 October 1564.

References

External links
Arms of Cuthbert Scott, Bishop of Chester: Argent, a chevron between three pelicans' heads erased at the neck Sable.

16th-century births
1564 deaths
16th-century English Roman Catholic bishops
Bishops of Chester
Masters of Christ's College, Cambridge
Vice-Chancellors of the University of Cambridge